The National Census of Nepal is conducted every ten years to collect information about the demographic, social, economic and other parameters. The first census in Nepal was done in 1911 using a traditional approach. Since 1952/54 the census was done by adopting modern scientific methods. At present, the census is carried out by the Central Bureau of Statistics under the National Planning Commission. The census is a mandatory process to be carried out at every 10 years as per the Article 281 of Constitution of Nepal.

Census

1991

This was the ninth census conducted in Nepal.

2001

This was the tenth census conducted in Nepal.

2011

This was the eleventh census conducted in Nepal.

2021

This is the twelfth census being conducted in Nepal.

Results
The population of Nepal as per the census is given in the table below.

Controversies
Experts from various sectors have critiqued the census for producing wrong data.

Languages

The census has been critiqued for showing too many language speakers. They've laid issues with pointing foreign languages as mother tongue in Nepal. There are controversies around what consists of a language and what consists of a dialect.

References

External links
 Central Bureau of Statistics, Nepal
 Central Bureau of Statistics (Old website)

Censuses in Nepal
Demographics of Nepal